The Halam community are various tribes native to the state of Tripura in India. The name Halam was coined by the Tipra Maharaja. As per their oral tradition they called themselves "Riam", which literally means "Human being". And lyrically they also call themselves "Riamrai, Raivon, Longvon, Chepvon etc.". The Halam are further divided into 12 sub-tribes, namely Chorai, Molsom, Hrangkhol, Kaipeng, Kalai, Ranglong, Sakachep, Thangachep, Bongcher, Korbwng, Dab and Rupini.

History
In terms of ethnology and language, the Halam community group belongs to Old Kuki groups. But it is difficult to trace their original settlement. Different scholars propounded different theories in analyzing the migratory route of Halam. However, no anthropological research documents are available about them. According to their own belief and tradition the Halam originated from a place called ‘Khurpuitabum’ meaning ‘a big cave,’ which is supposed to be somewhere in south central China. This theory of origin is very common among the Chin-Mizo-Kuki groups with slight variations in name. Apart from Halam group, the Old Kuki tribes like Khelma/Sakachep,Aimol, Ranglong, Hrangkhol inhabit in the Karimganj district of Assam, North Tripura and Dalai district of Tripura and Mizoram, Anal, Chawthe, Chiru, Kolhen, Kom, Lamgang, Purum, Tikhup and Vaiphei of Manipur also asserted that they are the descendant of a couple who came out of ‘Khurpui’ meaning ‘cave’ (B. Lalthangliana, 2001, Mizo Chanchin, Remkungi, Aizawl, p. 37)

According to S.B.K. Dev Varman, the Halam community coined by Tipra Maharaja (S.B.K. Dev Varman, The Tribes of Tripura, p. 35). The Halams group are said to be migrated from ‘Khurpuitabum,’ a place in the hills just to the north of Manipur (Ibid. p. 35). Those of the Kukis, who had submitted to the Tripura Raja, came to be known as Halam (http://www.tripuratribes.ac.in). They are not concentrated in a particular area. They are scattered in three North-eastern states, in western Mizoram, parts of North Cachar Hills, Barak Valley of Assam, and in all eight revenue district of Tripura.

Regarding the origin of the term ‘Halam,’ some suggest that ‘Halam’ means ‘killer of human beings’ (K.S. Singh, People of India, Vol. V, p. 1243). Perhaps, the neighboring people might name them ‘Halam’ as they were ferocious and used to killed strangers in olden days. The term ‘Halam’ is expected to be coined by others. One interpretation is that, in Tripuri language, ‘Ha’ means ‘earth’ and ‘Lam’ means ‘route’. So it means ‘earth route.’ It is said that when they came in contact with the king of Tripura, the Maharaja had given them the title ‘Halam.’ From this definition it can be presumed that Halam migrated to their present place of settlement through earth route. However, there is no agreed point on the origin of the term ‘Halam.’ In the Scheduled Castes and Scheduled Tribes orders (Amendment) Act. 1976, Halam is placed at No. 6 in the list of Scheduled Tribes of Tripura. Due to long lapse of time and years, sometimes it may create confusion in one's mind that different sub-tribes of Halam community are of different identity. But they are of the same tribe having common origin.

The Halam sub-tribes
The language spoken by all the families of Halam community is known as Riam Chong (language). The Riam Chong is cognate with the Kuki-Chin group of the greater Tibeto-Burman family. Owing to topographical differences in their habitation, there are minor dialect differences among the Riam speaking people known as Halam group language for officially known under Tripura State government as one of the minority languages (Kept under Kokborok & OML) Dept. of Education. Besides, due to assimilation by other bigger communities, their language and culture have been gravely affected. In fact, the Molsom and Kaipeng sub-tribes have to a great extent incorporated Kokborok vocabulary in their daily verbal communication among themselves. In Tripura, there has been conscious effort by the Government to promote and develop Halam language. Accordingly, the Government has constituted the ‘Halam Language Advisory Committee’ to take necessary steps for the uplift of Halam language. As far as literature is concerned, the Halam have no script of their own. They borrowed from Roman script for any sort of documentations and writings.

Changes in religious practices
It is not known when the Halam community came under the influence of Hinduism. Although the people claim themselves to be Hindu, there are a good number of animistic traits found in their religious activities that appears to be contradictory to Hinduism. This is more evident when it is compared especially with the neighboring Bengali Hindus. Married women among the Halam, for instance, do not use vermilion bangles and iron bracelets which are commonly used as a sign of a married woman especially among the neighboring Bengali Hindu woman. In fact, there is no symbolic dress or ornament which can differentiate a married Halam from an unmarried one. A few of them follow Vaishnavism and worship Krishna and Radha. But, most of them take non-vegetarian food like pork, fish, dry fish etc. which the neighboring Bengali Vaishnav regard as taboos. Some worship the Hindu goddess Lakshmi; instead of making an idol of the goddess; they make the image of Lakshmi with rice and egg. They keep some rice in an earthen pot and place an egg on the rice. They then place the earthen pot containing rice and egg under bamboo. Lakshmi is usually worshipped on the day of a full moon by sacrificing a hen and offering egg and beer made of rice.

Conversion to Christianity started about the mid-1900s. About 30% of the Halam are Christians. The spread of Christianity among the Halam does not interfere with cultural activities (except religious activities). The Christian Halam attended the socio-cultural ceremonies of their Hindu neighbors. They participate in and depend on the traditional village administration as do their Hindu neighbors. There is a reason why the Tripura Raja differentiate Halam from Kuki, Halam people do not have king or chief nor their own god to worship. So, the Raja appointed Sordar to rule Halam people, and an idol for each clan to worship. E.g. Mualţhuam/Molsom sub-tribe are given an idol made from Gooseberry tree, they called Zobawmthang. Bawngcher sub-clan are given Thirlum Thirphrai. Thirlum is an iron ball smaller than the size of cricket ball, Thirphrai is an iron plate, a size of thumb. Both have no inscriptions on them.

Agriculture
The Halam eat through a combination of foraging and farming. They collect edible leaves, roots, stems and tubers from the rain forest and catch fish from the nearby rivers. In recent times, they have become familiar with horticulture .They farm bananas, jackfruit, betel nuts, papaya and grains. They keep livestock such as goats, cows and pigs.

Education
The Halam are well educated by Western standards. They were well educated by their family. Most of Halam graduate from the state schools. But some students usually drop out of school because they cannot afford to study any longer. The overall literacy percentage among the Halam is around 85%. The literacy rate is higher for males than females.

Literature
The Halam have no written language. Because of this, there is no record of their history and traditions. They use the Latin alphabet for documentation and writings. The history of their tribe must be transmitted orally.

Diaspora
During the British Raj, the Halam of Tripura were transported to the Sylhet region to work in tea plantations. They can still be found in Sylhet and Habiganj,where they continue this livelihood. They make up a mere population of only 5000. Use of the Kokborok language is rapidly decreasing with the Bengali language being more common nowadays. They are divided into 12 clans; Machafang, Migli, Charai, Bongcher, Hrangkhol, Molsom, Rupini, Mitahar, Langkai, Kaloi, Kalja and Kaipeng.

References

Kuki tribes
Scheduled Tribes of India
Ethnic groups in Bangladesh